FC Svilengrad (ФК Свиленград) is a Bulgarian football club from the town of Svilengrad, currently playing in the South-East Third League, the third division of Bulgarian football.

History
It was founded on August 1, 1921 and was formerly known as Botev Sport Club. 

Svilengrad 1921 plays its home matches in the Kolodruma Stadium, has a capacity of 1,750 spectators. The record attendance is 2,500 for the game of Bulgarian Cup against CSKA Sofia on 25 November 2009.

Current squad 
As of 1 August 2019

League positions

References

External links 
 Official website 

Svilengrad 1921
1921 establishments in Bulgaria
Association football clubs established in 1921